N-Methyl-PPPA, or ''N''-methyl-3-phenoxy-3-phenylpropan-1-amine, is a serotonin-norepinephrine reuptake inhibitor (SNRI) which was developed by Eli Lilly from diphenhydramine in the early 1970s while in search of new antidepressants, but was never marketed. It is closely related structurally to fluoxetine, atomoxetine, and nisoxetine.

See also
 3-Phenoxy-3-phenylpropan-1-amine (PPPA)
 Development and discovery of SSRI drugs
 Aryloxypropanamine scaffold

References

Antidepressants
Eli Lilly and Company brands
Serotonin–norepinephrine reuptake inhibitors